Baron Astley of Reading, in the County of Berkshire, was a title in the Peerage of England. It was created in 1644 for the Royalist soldier Sir Jacob Astley. He was a descendant of Ralph Astley (13th century), brother of Andrew de Astley, ancestor of the Barons Astley. The title became extinct on the death of Lord Astley of Reading's grandson, the third Baron, in 1688.

The first Baron was the uncle of Sir Isaac Astley, 1st Baronet, and the great-uncle of Sir Jacob Astley, 1st Baronet.

Barons Astley of Readings (1644)
Jacob Astley, 1st Baron Astley of Reading (died 1651)
Isaac Astley, 2nd Baron Astley of Reading (died 1662)
Jacob Astley, 3rd Baron Astley of Reading (died 1688)

See also
Baron Astley (1295)
Astley baronets
Baron Hastings

References

1644 establishments in England
Extinct baronies in the Peerage of England
Noble titles created in 1644